Marko Bajić (born 28 September 1985) is a Serbian football midfielder who plays for Croatian club Bobota Agrar.

References

External links
 
 
 

1985 births
Footballers from Belgrade
Living people
Serbian footballers
Association football midfielders
FK Modriča players
Górnik Zabrze players
Lechia Gdańsk players
Lechia Gdańsk II players
Al-Madina SC players
Górnik Łęczna players
Bytovia Bytów players
OFK Bačka players
FK Mladost Velika Obarska players
Ekstraklasa players
I liga players
Serbian First League players
Serbian expatriate footballers
Expatriate footballers in Bosnia and Herzegovina
Serbian expatriate sportspeople in Bosnia and Herzegovina
Expatriate footballers in Poland
Serbian expatriate sportspeople in Poland
Expatriate footballers in Libya
Serbian expatriate sportspeople in Libya
Expatriate footballers in Croatia
Serbian expatriate sportspeople in Croatia